The ESSE Asoke is a skyscraper in Bangkok, Thailand that stands at 777 feet tall. It was completed in 2019. It is a residential tower with 419 individual residences.

References

Skyscrapers in Bangkok